Gerardo Luigi Colonna (September 17, 1904 – November 21, 1986), better known as Jerry Colonna, was an American musician, actor, comedian, singer, songwriter and trombonist who played the zaniest of Bob Hope's sidekicks in Hope's popular radio shows and films of the 1940s and 1950s. He also voiced the March Hare in Disney's 1951 animated film Alice in Wonderland.

With his pop-eyed facial expressions and large handlebar moustache, Colonna was known for singing loudly in what Gerald Nachman called a "comic caterwaul", and for his catchphrase, "Who's Yehudi?", uttered after many an old joke, though it usually had nothing to do with the joke itself. The line was believed to be named for violin virtuoso Yehudi Menuhin, and "the search for Yehudi" became a running gag on Hope's show.

Colonna played a range of nitwitted characters, the best-remembered of which was a moronic professor, of which Nachman wrote:
Colonna brought a whacked-out touch to Hope's show. In a typical exchange, Hope asks, "Professor, did you plant the bomb in the embassy like I told you?", to which Colonna replied, in that whooping five-alarm voice, "Embassy? Great Scott, I thought you said NBC!"

Musical career
Colonna started his career as a trombonist in orchestras and dance bands in and around his native Boston; he can be heard with Joe Herlihy's orchestra on discs recorded for Edison Records in the late 1920s. During the 1930s, Colonna played with the CBS house orchestra, the Columbia Symphony Orchestra, and developed a reputation for prankishness. During his tenure at CBS he occasionally worked under bandleader Raymond Scott, and made several recordings with Scott's famous Quintette, which typically involved Colonna mouthing nonsense syllables over Scott's band. His off-stage antics were so calamitous that CBS nearly fired him on more than one occasion. Fred Allen, then on CBS, gave Colonna periodic guest slots, and a decade later he joined the John Scott Trotter band on Bing Crosby's Kraft Music Hall.

In an opera parody, Colonna hollered an aria "in a deadpan screech that became his trademark" on Bob Hope's show, Nachman noted. Colonna was one of three memorable 1940s Kraft Music Hall discoveries. The others were pianist-comedian Victor Borge and Trotter's drummer, music "depreciationist" Spike Jones.

Colonna had the ability to stretch a syllable to extreme lengths. In addition to songs (such as "Aaaaaaaaaaaaaaaaaaall, or nothing at aaaaaaaaaaaaaaaaaaall..."), he worked this bit into Road to Rio along with another of his catchphrases. The action periodically cuts to a cavalry riding to the rescue of Bing and Bob. At one point he exhorts his riders, "Chaaaaaaaaaaaaaaaaaaarge!" At the end of the film, when all is resolved and he is still "charging," he pulls up and tells the audience, "Well, what do you know... we never quite made it. Exciting, though... wasn't it?!"

According to radio historian Arthur Frank Wertheim, in Radio Comedy, Colonna was responsible for many of the catchphrases on Hope's show, notably, "Give me a drag on that before you throw it away", a crack the cast came to use to lance any bragging. Colonna's usual salutation to Hope was, "Greetings, Gate!" and listeners soon began saying it.

Colonna was part of several of Hope's early USO tours during the 1940s. Jack Benny's singing sidekick Dennis Day, a talented impressionist as well as a singer, did an effective imitation of Colonna's manic style and expressions.

Colonna joined ASCAP in 1956; his songwriting credits include "At Dusk", "I Came to Say Goodbye", "Sleighbells in the Sky" and "Take Your Time." In the 1950s he released two LPs, Music? for Screaming!!! (Decca DL 5540) and He Sings and Swings (Mercury-Wing MGW 12153).

Films

Colonna featured in three of the popular Hope-Crosby Road films: Road to Singapore (1940) as Achilles Bombassa, Road to Rio (1947) as a Cavalry captain and The Road to Hong Kong (1962) in a cameo role. He can also be seen in the Fred Allen vehicle, It's in the Bag! (1945), as psychiatrist Dr. Greenglass, and he made a brief appearance with Hope in the "Wife, Husband and Wolf" sketch in Star Spangled Rhythm. In 1956 he performed the featured song "My Lucky Charm" in the film Meet Me in Las Vegas, starring Dan Dailey and Cyd Charisse.

He provided the voice of the March Hare in the Walt Disney animated film version of Alice in Wonderland (1951) (another radio star, Ed Wynn, voiced the hare's companion, the Mad Hatter) and also lent his zany narration style to several Disney shorts, including Casey at the Bat from Make Mine Music (1946) and The Brave Engineer (1950).

Filmography

Television

Colonna left the Hope show as a regular in 1950, but he continued appearing with Hope on holiday television specials and live shows. He hosted his own television comedy series, The Jerry Colonna Show, which lasted a single season.

He was host of the "Revenge with Music" episode on The Colgate Comedy Hour in 1954. His TV work also included voicing Moon Mad Tiger on Time for Beany, serving as the second and last ringmaster/host/performer on Super Circus (1955–56), and appearing in a version of Babes in Toyland on Shirley Temple's Storybook in 1960. He also made guest appearances in the 1957 Climax! episode "The Giant Killer"; the 1959 The Gale Storm Show episode "Come Back, Little Beatnik"; the 1965 McHale's Navy episode "Hello, McHale? Colonna!"; and the 1966 The Monkees episode "Don't Look a Gift Horse in the Mouth".

Colonna also appeared in one of the oldest surviving kinescope recordings of a live television broadcast, from 1947.

Personal life
He was of Italian heritage. Colonna's parents were Elisabetta Magro and Giuseppe Colonna from Muro Lucano (Potenza). He married Florence Purcell, (Porciello) whom he reportedly met on a blind date in 1930; the couple adopted a son, Robert, in 1941. The marriage lasted 56 years. After his guest shot on The Monkees, Colonna suffered a stroke. Its paralytic effect forced his retirement from show business (save for a couple of brief cameo appearances in late 1960s/early 1970s Bob Hope specials), and a 1979 heart attack forced him to spend the last seven years of his life in the Motion Picture and Television Hospital. Florence stayed by his side to the end, when he died of kidney failure in 1986. She died eight years later at the same hospital.

His son, Robert Colonna, has been involved in theater for nearly 60 years, since first appearing on stage with his father.  He was a member of the famed Trinity Repertory Company in Providence, Rhode Island. He is the founder and director of the Rhode Island Shakespeare Theater. He has also directed many productions at Rhode Island College, and in 2007, published a biography of his father's life, Greetings, Gate!: The Story of Professor Jerry Colonna.

Colonna's great-great niece is American stand-up comedienne Sarah Colonna. It is not known if he was related to the Italian Colonna family of nobles.

Popular culture references

Colonna was a popular radio and film figure at the same time that Warner Bros. cartoons hit their stride. Accordingly, his facial expressions and catchphrases were caricatured many times in the company's cartoons. Along with "Greetings, Gates!" variations and references to "Yehudi," several cartoons included variations on his oft-used observation, "Ahhhh, yes! [appropriate adjective], isn't it?!"
In the 1938 Merrie Melodies cartoon A-Lad-In Bagdad, the Sultan is a Colonna caricature.
In the Merrie Melodies cartoon Bars and Stripes Forever, the Warden's voice is based on Colonna's.
In the Merrie Melodies cartoon Dangerous Dan McFoo, his character Peppino the Barber appears.
In the Merrie Melodies cartoon Detouring America, a Colonna caricature makes a cameo as the "cowpunching" cowboy.
In the Merrie Melodies cartoon Busy Bakers, one of the baker elves is a Colonna caricature.
In the Looney Tunes cartoon Prehistoric Porky, a vulture caricature of Colonna appears.
The Merrie Melodies cartoons The Wacky Worm (1941) and Greetings Bait (1943) both star a worm who is a Colonna caricature, complete with moustache and exaggerated voice (supplied by Mel Blanc). The latter cartoon, which also takes its title from Colonna's "Greetings, Gate" catchphrase, features an animated human Colonna as a fisherman.
Jerry Colonna was one of the party-going celebrities caricatured in the 1941 Merrie Melodies cartoon Hollywood Steps Out.
In the 1942 Looney Tunes cartoon The Ducktators, there is a rabbit that briefly appears and is a caricature of Colonna.
In the 1943 Looney Tunes Daffy Duck cartoon The Wise Quacking Duck, Daffy imitates Colonna as a fortune teller.
In the 1944 Merrie Melodies cartoon What's Cookin' Doc?, Bugs Bunny is saying "Hi" to various (unseen) Hollywood figures as they walk by his table at the Oscar banquet, and Bugs mimics them. At one point, he bugs his eyes, opens his mouth wide to display squared-off, gapped teeth, and says, "Ahhhh! Greetings, Jerry!"
In the 1944 Merrie Melodies cartoon Slightly Daffy, a Native American warrior, mimicking Colonna, threatens cavalry soldier Porky Pig with "Greetings, Gate!  Let's scalpitate!"
In the 1944 Looney Tunes cartoon Plane Daffy, after his second electrifying kiss with Hata Mari, Daffy imitates Colonna: "Ahhhhhhh! Something new has been added!"
In the 1945 Merrie Melodies cartoon The Unruly Hare, as Elmer Fudd jams his rifle directly into Bugs Bunny's spine, Bugs warns, "Only a big, fat rat would shoot a guy in the back." But Fudd does pull the trigger, then wheels to the camera and defiantly admits, "So I'm a big, fat wat!" But Bugs emerges from the cloud of gunpowder smoke, and says in Colonna's voice, "Ahhhhhh, have some cheese, rrrrrat!" and smashes a hunk of cheese into Fudd's face.
In the 1946 Looney Tunes cartoon Daffy Doodles, Daffy goes on trial for defacing posters by drawing mustaches on them. At the conclusion, an entire jury of mustachioed Jerry Colonnas delivers the verdict "Ahhhhhhh yes! Not guilty!"
 In the 1951 Looney Tunes cartoon Rabbit Every Monday, Bugs Bunny utters Colonna's trademark phrase "I don't ask questions, I just have fun!"

In the 1944 comedy Trocadero, Johnny Downs, in a vaudeville duo routine, dons a fake Colonna-style moustache and mimics Colonna's singing voice.

Colonna was also mentioned in Jack Kerouac's 1957 novel On the Road.

In 1999, Jeff MacKay portrayed Colonna in the JAG episode "Ghosts of Christmas Past."

References

Gerald Nachman, Raised on Radio (New York: Pantheon Books, 1998).
Arthur Frank Wertheim, Radio Comedy (New York: Oxford University Press, 1979).

External links

WFMU's Jerry Colonna Homage

The Encyclopedia of Disney Animated Shorts

1904 births
1986 deaths
20th-century American male actors
20th-century American singers
American male comedians
American male film actors
American male radio actors
American male singer-songwriters
American male voice actors
American people of Italian descent
American trombonists
Disney people
Male trombonists
Burials at San Fernando Mission Cemetery
Deaths from kidney failure
Male actors from Boston
RCA Victor artists
Singer-songwriters from Massachusetts
Vaudeville performers
Vocalion Records artists
20th-century trombonists
20th-century American comedians
20th-century American male singers
Comedy franchises
United Service Organizations entertainers